Swine Palace is a non-profit professional theatre company associated with the Louisiana State University Department of Theatre in Baton Rouge, Louisiana. The theatre companies home is located in the Reilly Theatre on the campus of LSU.

History
In 1992, an historic livestock judging pavilion called the Swine Palace was slated for and spared demolition by a grant from the Reilly family and the efforts of Gresdna Doty of the LSU Theatre Department. The theater company founded in 1992 by Barry Kyle (former Artistic Director of the Royal Shakespeare Company’s Swan Theatre) in association with LSU Department of Theatre was named after the original name of the building in which it would be located. The Swine Palace building was renamed the Reilly Theatre and was designed to maintain the architectural integrity of its original origins. The first play presented in the Swine Palace building was not a Swine Palace theater company production, but an LSU Theatre student production of Shakespeare's Twelfth Night, during the spring of 1973.

During the spring of 2007, in conjunction with the LSU Performing Arts Series and Ping Chong and Company, the Swine Palace produced the world premiere of Cocktail, written by Vince LiCata and Ping Chong. Based on the true struggles of Thai scientist Krisana Kraisintu, this play follows the struggle to create an affordable version of the anti-HIV drug AZT for the thousands of Thai AIDS patients.

In June 2007, LSU Theatre and Swine Palace embarked on the first-ever international tour performing Wendy Wasserstein's "The Heidi Chronicles" directed by Michael Tick at the Shanghai Dramatic Arts Centre and the Beijing Central Academy of Drama. As such, they were the first theatre company to perform Ms. Wassersteins's work in China, and one of only a handful of U.S. companies to perform at either of these prestigious institutions.

The China tour was conceived as part of LSU's University-wide China initiative and included five performances at the Shanghai Dramatic Arts Centre, the largest performing arts institution in Shanghai, and three performances at the Beijing Central Academy of Drama, one of the finest academies in Asia. The play was originally performed as part of Swine Palace's 2006–2007 season. In total, 31 people made the month-long trip, including 15 undergraduates and graduate students; six faculty members and a number of friends and family.

Production history

See also
 Louisiana State University
 Theater in Louisiana

References

External links
 Official page at LSU.edu
 Official Instagram @swinepalace
 Official Facebook page

Louisiana State University buildings and structures
Theatres in Louisiana
Theatre companies in Louisiana
Tourist attractions in Baton Rouge, Louisiana
1992 establishments in Louisiana